Edvaldo Alves de Santa Rosa (March 16, 1934 – September 17, 2002), better known as Dida, was a Brazilian football player. Following his retirement, he remained with Flamengo, working for two decades with the club's youth teams.

On September 17, 2002, he died of cancer in a Rio de Janeiro hospital, at the age of 68.

Dida is the 2nd high scorer in Flamengo's history with 244 goals. He was capped six times for his country, including the 1958 World Cup, scoring four goals.

Honours
Alagoas State Championship 1952
Rio State Championship 1954, 1955, 1963
Rio-São Paulo Tournament 1961
1958 FIFA World Cup - Winner

References

External links
Former Brazil star Dida dies - ESPN Soccernet, 9/18/02

1934 births
2002 deaths
Brazilian footballers
Brazil international footballers
Association football forwards
CR Flamengo footballers
Atlético Junior footballers
Associação Portuguesa de Desportos players
1958 FIFA World Cup players
FIFA World Cup-winning players
Deaths from cancer in Rio de Janeiro (state)
Sportspeople from Alagoas